The United Nations Secretary-General's Mechanism for Investigation of Alleged Use of Chemical and Biological Weapons (UNSGM), is a tool that allows the Secretary-General to investigate alleged uses of biological or chemical weapons. The UNSGM is not a standing investigative body, but instead relies on a member state-provided list of qualified experts, consultants, and analytical laboratories that may be activated on short notice to support UNSGM investigations.

Process and mandate 
Any UN member state may request the Secretary-General to launch an investigation into a possible biological or chemical weapons use. The Secretary-General has the authority to dispatch a fact-finding mission to the site of the alleged incident, and to report the investigation results to the international community.

The UN Office for Disarmament Affairs (UNODA) is the custodian of the UNSGM and maintains its operational readiness. As such, UNODA keeps an updated roster of qualified experts, experts consultants, and analytical laboratories that may be called upon to participate in or advise UNSGM investigations. As of 2022, the UNSGM roster includes approximately 500 qualified experts, 40 expert consultants, and 80 analytical laboratories. In addition, UNODA facilitates specialized training courses for the qualified experts and conducts outreach activities.

Relationship with international treaties 
Regarding biological weapons, the UNSGM is separate and independent from the Biological Weapons Convention (BWC). Since the BWC lacks an international institution to verify and enforce member states' compliance with the treaty, the UNSGM remains the only international mechanism for investigations into alleged uses of biological weapons.

On the chemical weapons side, the Organisation for the Prohibition of Chemical Weapons (OPCW) implements the Chemical Weapons Convention (CWC). OPCW was created in 1997, the year the CWC entered into force, and is mandated to investigate allegations of chemical weapons use, with the exception of investigations in states that have not joined the CWC. Even in the latter case, the OPCW supports the Secretary-General in conducting investigations.

Past investigations 
The UNSGM was activated three times to date, each time to investigate the alleged use of chemical weapons.

See also 

 Geneva Protocol
 Biological Weapons Convention
 Chemical Weapons Convention

References

Further reading

External links 

 Secretary-General's Mechanism, UN Office for Disarmament Affairs
 UNSGM fact sheet
 UNGSM newsletter
 Key documents
 UNSGM technical appendices (updated in 2007)
 UN General Assembly resolution A/42/37 C (1987): Mandate for the UNSGM
 UN Security Council resolution S/RES/620 (1988): Reaffirmation of the mandate by the Security Council
 UN General Assembly document A/44/561, annex I (1990): Guidelines and Procedures for a UNSGM investigation; endorsed by the GA in 1990 (resolution A/45/57)

United Nations